Hiärneite is an oxide mineral named after the Swedish geologist Urban Hiärne (1641-1727). The mineral can be found in rocks that mainly consists of fine grained phlogopite. Hiärneite is the first known mineral that contains both of the chemical elements antimony and zirconium. The mineral was described in 1997 for its occurrence in a skarn environment in Långban iron–manganese deposit of the Filipstad district, Värmland, Sweden.

Sources

Tetragonal minerals
Minerals in space group 142
Oxide minerals